Tillman is a given name and surname.

Tillman may also refer to:

Places in the United States 
Tillman, Florida
Tillman, Indiana
Tillman, Missouri
Tillman, South Carolina
Tillman County, Oklahoma

Other uses 
Tillman (dog), a skateboarding dog
USS Tillman
USS Tillman (DD-135), a Wickes-class destroyer
USS Tillman (DD-641), a Gleaves-class destroyer
Tillman battleships, the Maximum battleship design proposed by Senator Benjamin Tillman

See also
 
 Dillman (disambiguation)